Shaun Edwards (born 13 December 1993) is a former professional Australian rules footballer who played for the Greater Western Sydney Giants and Essendon Football Club in the Australian Football League (AFL).

AFL career
Edwards was drafted by Greater Western Sydney in 2011, where he played his debut year in the NEAFL before they moved into the AFL, his first NEAFL match was against the Northern Territory Thunder at TIO Stadium. He made his AFL debut against  at AAMI Stadium in round 4, 2012. Edwards played the 2014 season in the Essendon VFL team before breaking into the senior team in round 11 of the 2015 season. Edwards won the Bill Hutchinson Community Award at the 2016 Crichton Medal presentations.

At the conclusion of the 2016 season, despite strong performances in the VFL, Edwards was delisted by Essendon. He was subsequently drafted by Sydney in the 2017 rookie draft. After failing to play a match during the 2017 season, he retired from AFL football at the conclusion of the season to focus on Indigenous education in Australia and around the world.

Statistics
 Statistics are correct to the end of the 2017 season

|- style="background-color: #EAEAEA"
! scope="row" style="text-align:center" | 2012
|
| 22 || 10 || 2 || 4 || 91 || 41 || 132 || 31 || 11 || 0.2 || 0.4 || 9.1 || 4.1 || 13.2 || 3.1 || 1.1
|-
! scope="row" style="text-align:center" | 2013
|
| 22 || 2 || 0 || 1 || 10 || 15 || 25 || 6 || 2 || 0.0 || 0.5 || 5.0 || 7.5 || 12.5 || 3.0 || 1.0
|- style="background:#eaeaea;"
! scope="row" style="text-align:center" | 2014
|
| 19 || 0 || — || — || — || — || — || — || — || — || — || — || — || — || — || —
|-
! scope="row" style="text-align:center" | 2015
|
| 19 || 9 || 8 || 6 || 62 || 28 || 90 || 21 || 19 || 0.9 || 0.7 || 6.9 || 3.1 || 10.0 || 2.3 || 2.1
|- style="background:#eaeaea;"
! scope="row" style="text-align:center" | 2016
|
| 19 || 3 || 0 || 1 || 33 || 16 || 49 || 7 || 5 || 0.0 || 0.3 || 11.0 || 5.3 || 16.3 || 2.3 || 1.7
|-
! scope="row" style="text-align:center" | 2017
|
| 19 || 0 || — || — || — || — || — || — || — || — || — || — || — || — || — || —
|- class="sortbottom"
! colspan=3| Career
! 24
! 10
! 12
! 196
! 100
! 296
! 65
! 37
! 0.4
! 0.5
! 8.2
! 4.2
! 12.3
! 2.7
! 1.5
|}

References

External links

1993 births
Living people
Greater Western Sydney Giants players
Essendon Football Club players
Australian rules footballers from the Northern Territory
Indigenous Australian players of Australian rules football
Australia international rules football team players
St Mary's Football Club (NTFL) players
Sydney University Australian National Football Club players